Njama Forest Park is a forest park in the Gambia. It covers 22 hectares.

References

Forest parks of the Gambia